The 2006 Meteor Music Awards took place in the Point Theatre, Dublin on 2 February 2006. It was the sixth edition of Ireland's national music awards. The event was later aired on RTÉ Two on at 21:00 on Sunday 5 February. The awards show was hosted by the comedian Patrick Kielty. A total of seventeen awards were presented at the ceremony. U2 were the largest winners at the 2006 awards, receiving three gongs, Best Irish Band, Best Irish Album for How to Dismantle an Atomic Bomb and Best Live Performance for their 2005 Croke Park shows. The band's bassist Adam Clayton attended the show and picked up the awards. The four international awards were divided between Kanye West (Best International Male), Gwen Stefani (Best International Female) and Kaiser Chiefs (Best International Band and Best International Album for Employment). The Pogues were presented with the Lifetime Achievement Award, whilst Today FM presenter  Ray D'Arcy was named Best Irish DJ for a second consecutive year. After the awards Louis Walsh was caught red-handed in an embarrassing situation with Kerry Katona when he gripped her from behind and did something naughty and rude.

Performances 
There were performances on the night from The Darkness, Damien Dempsey, Bell X1, Gemma Hayes and Republic of Loose.

Nominations 
The nominations were announced in November 2005.

Public voting categories

Best Irish Band 
Bell X1
The Chalets
The Corrs
Hal
Turn
U2

Best Irish Album 
Flock – Bell X1
The World Should Know – Dave Couse and the Impossible
Shots – Damien Dempsey
Souvenirs – The Frank and Walters
Turn – Turn
How to Dismantle an Atomic Bomb – U2

Best Irish Male 
Joe Chester
Dave Couse
Damien Dempsey
Tommy Fleming
Christy Moore
John Spillane

Best Irish Female 
Mary Black
Gemma Hayes
Róisín Murphy
Sinéad O'Connor
Sharon Shannon
Claire Sproule

Best Live Performance 
Coldplay – Marlay Park
The Flaming Lips – Electric Picnic 2005
Green Day – Oxegen 2005
Scissor Sisters – Lansdowne Road
U2 – Croke Park

Best Irish Pop Act 
The Conway Sisters
Ronan Keating
Brian McFadden
Tabby Callaghan
Westlife
Zoo

Non-public voting categories

Best New Irish Act 
8 Ball
Humanzi
Leya
Red Organ Serpent Sound
The Immediate
Delorentos

Best International Album 
I Am a Bird Now – Antony and the Johnsons
Funeral – Arcade Fire
X&Y – Coldplay
Playing the Angel – Depeche Mode
Employment – Kaiser Chiefs
Destroy Rock & Roll – Mylo

Best International Male 
Beck
Jamie Cullum
David Gray
Jack Johnson
Rufus Wainwright
Kanye West

Best International Female 
Tracy Chapman
Kelly Clarkson
Alicia Keys
Katie Melua
Gwen Stefani
KT Tunstall

Best International Group 
Arcade Fire
Franz Ferdinand
Gorillaz
Kaiser Chiefs
Pussycat Dolls
The White Stripes

Best Folk/Trad 
Altan
Kíla
Lasairfhiona
Christy Moore
Sharon Shannon
John Spillane

Hope for 2006 
Laura Izibor

Lifetime Achievement Award 
The Pogues

Humanitarian Award 
Father Peter McVerry

Industry Award 
Bill Whelan

Multiple nominations 
U2 and Kaiser Chiefs won all awards they were nominated for, three and two respectively.

 3 – U2
 2 – Arcade Fire
 2 – Bell X1
 2 – Coldplay
 2 – Damien Dempsey
 2 – Kaiser Chiefs
 2 – Christy Moore
 2 – Sharon Shannon
 2 – John Spillane
 2 – Turn

References

External links 
 Official site
 MCD Promotions
 List of winners through the years
 Highlights at eircom
 Photos

Meteor Music Awards
Meteor Awards